Warkauden Jalkapalloklubi (abbreviated Warkaus JK) is a football club from Varkaus in Finland.  The club was formed in 2000 and their home ground is at the Varkauden Keskuskenttä.  The men's first team currently plays in the Kakkonen (Second Division).  The Chairman of Warkaus JK is Jari Räisänen.

Background

The club was established in 2000 following the amalgamation of the Warkauden Pallo-35 and Varkauden Työväen Palloilijoiden clubs.  The new club has now played 10 consecutive seasons in the Kakkonen (Second Division), the third tier of Finnish football from 2001 to the present day. In 2002 the club finished in top position in the West Group but failed to progress in the Promotion Play-offs.

The 2008 season has been the most successful to date for Warkaus JK with the club getting through to the quarter-finals of the Suomen Cup before going out 2–0 away to Helsingin Jalkapalloklubi.  In Group A of the Kakkonen the team finished in second place, 5 points behind Klubi 04.

In 2009, Warkaus JK won the final of Työväen Urheiluliiton Cup (Workers' Sports Federation Cup) for the first time in their history.

Season to season

Club structure

Warkaus JK currently has 2 men's teams.  In addition there is a junior section known as WJK Juniorit which runs 8 boys teams and 4 girls teams.

2010 season

Warkaus JK Men's Team are competing in Group A (Lohko A) of the Kakkonen administered by the Football Association of Finland  (Suomen Palloliitto) .  This is the third highest tier in the Finnish football system.  In 2009 Warkauden Jalkapalloklubi finished in fourth position in their Kakkonen section.

Warkaus JK/2 are participating in Section B (Lohko B) of the Nelonen administered by the Itä-Suomi SPL.

References and sources
 Official Website
 WJK Juniorit Website
Finnish Wikipedia
Suomen Cup
 Warkaus JK Facebook

Footnotes

Football clubs in Finland
Varkaus
2000 establishments in Finland